Kızıldere is a Turkish word meaning "red creek" and may refer to:

Places
 Kızıldere, Buharkent, a village in Buharkent district of Aydın Province, Turkey
 Kızıldere, Ceyhan, a village in Ceyhan district of Adana Province, Turkey
 Kızıldere, Kırıkkale, a populated place in Kırıkkale Province, Turkey
 Kızıldere, Nazilli, a village in Nazilli district of Aydın Province, Turkey
 Kızıldere, the former name of Ataköy, Almus in Tokat Province, the village where Mahir Çayan and nine other leftist militants were killed by soldiers on 30 March 1972
Kızıldere, Mersin is a river in Mersin, turkey

Other uses
 Kızıldere Geothermal Power Plant, at Kızıldere village of Sarayköy district in Denizli Province, Turkey